Sibsankar Arabinda Roy (born 10 October 1990) is an Indian cricketer. He is a left-handed batter and a right-arm off-break bowler who plays for Assam in domestic cricket.

Career
Roy was born in Guwahati. He began his cricketing career in the youth ranks of Assam, in the 2001-02 National Under-14s tournament, aged just eleven. He moved up to the Under-15s team the following year, for whom he played for two consecutive seasons.

Roy started 2004-05 with the Under-19s team before moving to the Under-17s, moving back to the Under-19s in 2005-06. Roy maintained his position in the Under-19s in 2006-07, and played a couple of games for the Under-22s in 2007-08, before making his step up to the first team.

Roy made his List A debut for Assam in the 2007-08 Vijay Hazare Trophy against Orissa, scoring 35 runs in a narrow defeat. Roy's first-class debut followed the following season, making his debut in the second round of fixtures, against Tripura in the 2008-09 Ranji Trophy. He has played for East Zone and India Blue in the 2012–13 Deodhar Trophy and NKP Salve Challenger Trophy 2013-14 respectively.

References

External links
Sibsankar Roy at Cricinfo
Sibsankar Roy at Cricket Archive

1990 births
Indian cricketers
Living people
Assam cricketers
Cricketers from Guwahati
East Zone cricketers
India Blue cricketers